Vaughn Gittin Jr. (born September 20, 1980), commonly known as JR, is an American, self-taught, professional drifter from Maryland who competes in Formula Drift in a Ford Mustang RTR Spec 5-D sponsored by Monster Energy, Nitto Tire, and Ford Performance. One of drifting's most iconic figures, Gittin won the Formula Drift Championship in 2010 and 2020, and competes alongside teammate Chelsea DeNofa. Additionally, Gittin competes in the Ultra4 Racing series in his 4400 Class Ford Bronco and is the creator of RTR Vehicles, which is his vision for the Mustang, F-150, Ranger and other one of a kind Fords.

Motorsports career

Formula Drift

He took an extended break from formula drift following the 2021 season, moving into an owner role, and bringing on Adam LZ as a new driver.

NASCAR
On August 4, 2014, Gittin announced he would make his NASCAR Canadian Tire Series debut at Circuit Trois-Rivières in the No. 9 for Micks Motorsports. Qualifying 32nd and the only American in the field, Gittin spun in turn six on lap 7, but finished on the lead lap in 14th.

Other appearances
Gittin appears in the racing game Shift 2: Unleashed, as he is guiding the player through his career and teaching the player how to drift. He is also one of the rivals the player have to beat in two career modes, Drift and Muscle. If they beat him in the two story modes, they could earn his Monster Energy Falken Tire Ford Mustang in drift mode and his RTR-X in muscle mode. In the game, the most important thing that Gittin wants is that the player reaches the FIA GT1 Championship.He would also appear, in a smaller capacity, in the 2015 Reboot of Need For Speed alongside fellow Monster Energy driver Ken Block for the Style portion of its storyline. He also appeared alongside his Formula Drift teammate Chelsea DeNofa in Driving Line's Hangtime video.

Motorsports career results

Formula D achievements

2021 

 3rd-place at Formula D Rd. 1, Road Atlanta, GA
 3rd-place at Formula D Rd. 7, Streets Of Long Beach, CA
 3rd-place at Formula D Rd. 8, Irwindale Speedway, CA

2020 

 Formula Drift Champion
 1st-place winner at Formula D Rd. 3, Evergreen Speedway, WA
 1st-place winner at Formula D Rd. 4, Evergreen Speedway, WA
 3rd-place at Formula D Rd. 5, Texas Motor Speedway, TX
 2nd-place at Formula D Rd. 6, Texas Motor Speedway, TX

2018
 1st-place winner at Formula D Rd. 8, Irwindale Speedway, CA

2016
 1st-place winner at Formula D Rd. 2, Midway Raceway Road Atlanta, GA
 1st-place winner at Formula D Rd. 4, Wall Stadium Speedway, NJ

2014
 1st-place winner at Formula D Rd. 2, Midway Raceway Road Atlanta, GA
 1st-place winner at Formula D Rd. 3, Homestead-Miami Speedway, FL

2013
 2nd-place at Formula D Rd. 1, Streets of Long Beach, CA
 3rd-place at Formula D Rd. 3, Palm Beach International Raceway, FL

2012
 1st-place winner at Formula D Rd. 4, Wall Stadium Speedway, NJ
 1st-place winner at Formula D Rd. 5, Evergreen Speedway, WA

2011
 2nd-place at Formula Drift Rd. 3, Palm Beach International Raceway, FL
 World Drift Series Champion, Tianjin, China

2010
 1st-place winner at Formula Drift Rd. 1, Streets of Long Beach, CA
 2nd-place at Formula Drift Rd. 2, Midway Raceway Road Atlanta, GA
 2nd-place at Formula Drift Rd. 3, Wall Stadium Speedway, NJ
 1st-place winner at Formula Drift Rd. 6, Las Vegas, NV
 2nd-place at Formula Drift Rd. 7, Irwindale Speedway, CA
 Placed a podium finish in 6 of 7 events
 2010 Formula D Champion

2009
 2nd-place at Formula Drift Rd. 3, Wall Stadium Speedway, NJ

2008
 1st-place winner at Formula Drift Rd. 7, Irwindale Speedway, CA

2007
 1st-place winner at D1 Grand Prix USA All-Star World Championship, Irwindale Speedway, CA
 2nd-place at Formula D Rd. 5, Infineon Raceway, CA
 2nd-place at Formula D Rd. 4, Evergreen Speedway, WA

2005
 1st-place winner in the D1 Grand Prix America vs. Japan Competition
 3rd-place at Formula D Rd. 4, Infineon Raceway, CA
 Finished 4th place overall in the Formula D series

Ultra4 Racing

2021 

 1st-place at Ultra4 Nationals (4400 Unlimited Class)

2020 

 3rd-place at Ultra4 Nationals

2018 

 Ultra4 East Coast Champion

International
 2005 D1GP Winner
 2007 World Championship of Drifting
 2011, 2012 and 2013 World Drift Series Champion
 2014 King of Europe - Spain Winner

NASCAR
(key) (Bold – Pole position awarded by qualifying time. Italics – Pole position earned by points standings or practice time. * – Most laps led.)

Canadian Tire Series

Partners
 Monster Energy
 Nitto Tire
 Ford Performance
 Pennzoil
 K&N Filters
 BC Racing
 GearWrench Tools
 Mahle
 MBRP Exhaust
 Forza
 RTR Vehicles
 Alpinestars
 Center Line Wheels
 TYPE S Auto
 NGK Spark Plugs
 VP Racing Fuels

References

External links

Formula D profile

Wrecked Magazine - Drifting Publication's Section for Vaughn Gittin Jr.

1980 births
Living people
Drifting drivers
D1 Grand Prix drivers
Formula D drivers
Trans-Am Series drivers
Sportspeople from Annapolis, Maryland
Racing drivers from Baltimore
Racing drivers from Maryland
People from Joppatowne, Maryland